The 2000 Vanderbilt Commodores football team represented Vanderbilt University in the 2000 NCAA Division I-A football season.  The team was led by head coach Woody Widenhofer.

Schedule

Schedule Source:

Roster

References

Vanderbilt
Vanderbilt Commodores football seasons
Vanderbilt Commodores football